A. K. M. Fazlul Haque (এ, কে, এম, ফজলুল হক) is a Bangladesh Awami League politician and the incumbent Member of Parliament from Sherpur-3.

Early life
Haque was born on 16 January 1949. He studied engineering in his undergrad.

Career
Haque was elected to Parliament in 2008 and 2016 from Sherpur-3 as a candidate of Bangladesh Awami League. He is a Member of the Parliamentary Standing Committee on Water Resources Ministry.

References

Awami League politicians
Living people
1949 births
10th Jatiya Sangsad members
11th Jatiya Sangsad members
9th Jatiya Sangsad members